Manoharabad is a Mandal of the Medak district, Telangana, India. its erstwhile  name was YENNELLI-Harishankergoud Ramunigari.

Transport

Manoharabad has an existing railway station with code (MOB) and is an important part of the new Kothapalli-Manoharabad line connecting various districts and towns such as Karimnagar, Sircilla, Siddipet, Gajwel, etc to Hyderabad. The line is estimated to be completed in 2025.

References

Villages in Medak district